Nance-Major House and Store is a historic home and country store located across from the Charles City County Courthouse at Charles City, Charles City County, Virginia. The Nance-Major Store was built about 1872, and is a two-story, three-bay, gable-front frame building, supported by a brick pier foundation. The Nance-Major House was built about 1869, and is an "L"-shaped, 2 1/2-half story, post-and-beam-frame dwelling covered with painted horizontal weatherboard.  It has a steeply-pitched, front-gabled roof and features a two-story, three-bay, full-width porch.  Also located on the property are a contributing smokehouse, a grain barn, a tool shed, and a garage.  The store was in operation from 1874 until 1963.

It was added to the National Register of Historic Places in 2006.

References 

Houses on the National Register of Historic Places in Virginia
Greek Revival houses in Virginia
Houses completed in 1869
Houses in Charles City County, Virginia
National Register of Historic Places in Charles City County, Virginia
1869 establishments in Virginia